Walter Forster may refer to:
 Walter Forster (actor) (1917–1996), Brazilian actor
 Walter Forster (entomologist) (W. Forster, 1910–1986), German entomologist
 Walter Forster (screenwriter) (1900–1968), Austrian screenwriter

See also 
 Forster (surname)
 Walter Foster (disambiguation)